Robert Philip Atkinson (born 13 July 1998) is an English professional footballer who plays as a defender for Bristol City.

After playing youth football with AS Cannes, he started his senior career with Basingstoke Town in 2016, before signing for Fulham in 2017. He had a loan spell with Braintree Town in 2019, and joined Eastleigh on a permanent basis later that year. He joined Oxford United in January 2020, and Bristol City in July 2021.

Club career
Atkinson was born in Chesterfield, and spent much of his youth in France, playing for the academy of AS Cannes. He played for Knaphill U18s and first team before starting his senior football career at Basingstoke Town in the 2016–17 season, where he made thirty league appearances, scoring twice. He joined Fulham in September 2017 for a fee of £30,000 after a trial period with the club; he initially played for the club's under-23 side. He joined Braintree Town on loan in January 2019, and made 15 appearances for the club.

In June 2019, he signed for National League side Eastleigh, making 24 appearances in total for the Spitfires and impressing with the National League side.

Oxford United
In January 2020, he signed for League One side Oxford United for an undisclosed fee on a three-and-a-half-year contract, though he returned to Eastleigh on loan until the end of the season as part of the deal. He was recalled by Oxford United in February 2020 as a result of an injury to John Mousinho and a suspension for Robert Dickie. He made his professional debut on 5 October 2020, in a 1–1 EFL Cup draw with AFC Wimbledon, in which Oxford won on penalties. He scored his first league goal, and his first goal for Oxford, in a 4–1 home victory over Shrewsbury Town on 13 April 2021. Atkinson had a successful 2020–21 season, scoring once in 39 league appearances as the club finished 6th, qualifying for the play-offs, with Atkinson named in the EFL League One Team of the Season. Despite a goal for Atkinson in the play-off semi-final second leg against Blackpool, the club were eliminated from the play-offs after a 6–3 aggregate defeat.

He signed for Bristol City for an undisclosed seven-figure fee in July 2021.

Career statistics

Honours
Individual
PFA Team of the Year: 2020–21 League One
EFL League One Team of the Season: 2020–21

References

External links
 

1998 births
Living people
English footballers
Footballers from Chesterfield
Association football defenders
Basingstoke Town F.C. players
Fulham F.C. players
Braintree Town F.C. players
Eastleigh F.C. players
Oxford United F.C. players
Southern Football League players
National League (English football) players
English Football League players
English expatriate footballers
Expatriate footballers in France
English expatriate sportspeople in France
Bristol City F.C. players
AS Cannes players